Agha Iqrar Haroon ( (born August 16, 1965) is a Pakistani research journalist and political analyst. He started his career in 1986. Since then, he has been working on different assignments with different international television channels and newspapers including ETN News agency Islamabad, Al-Jazeera Television Islamabad, Abdu Dubai Television Islamabad, Chief Control News Waqt Television Lahore, Geo News Lahore and Dispatch News Desk News Agency. He appears as regional expert on different television channels of Pakistan including state run television PTV News.

Haroon worked with different media houses such as Nawa - i - Waqt Group, Al-Jazeera Television Channel in Pakistan, Abu Dhabi TV, Waqt TV, GEO News, and Abb Takk. He is currently as Foreign Affairs expert at state run television PTV News and Chief Editor of English and Russian news agency Dispatch News Desk. Haroon is a Research Scholar of Eurasian Studies and has been teaching in Central Asia and South Asia. He has written a number of research papers about development in Eurasia. Haroon won an International Award for his journalistic work in Central Asia. He has received the Award of Excellence from the Ministry of Foreign Affairs, Government of Kazakhstan.

Early life
Born in 1965, Haroon grew up in Lahore. He is a grandson of Hifz-ur-Rehman who was a Pakistani archaeologist, historian and linguist and son of Abdul Aziz, managing proprietor of the newspaper Paisa Akhbaar.

References

External links
 Azerbaijan – Pakistan media agencies sign a MoU
 New online link in Urdu launched in Pakistan
 LEARNING CHINESE, RUSSIAN THE NEW FAD
 Delegation of Pakistani News Agency visited IEPF office 
 Uzbek Tourist Department and DND News Agency signed a memorandum
 AZERTAC, Pakistani Dispatch News Desk agency to carry out news exchange 
 Delegation of Pakistani News Agency visited IEPF office 
 Road Map ready to intensify Pak-Kazakhstan bilateral economic cooperation
 Azerbaijan-Pakistan security cooperation enhancing: Ambassador Ali Alizada 
 Agha Iqrar becomes part of AEN Board 
 ‘India spent Rs7b to run anti-Pakistan campaign, Agha Iqrar

Living people
Pakistani male journalists
1965 births
Journalists from Lahore